Brachychiton megaphyllus, commonly known as the red-flowering kurrajong, is a tree of the genus Brachychiton found in northern Australia.

It was described in 1988 by Gordon Guymer in his revision of the genus, previously having been considered a variant of Brachychiton paradoxus.

Hybrids with Brachychiton multicaulis have been reported.

The dark brown bark has vertical furrows and shallow tessellations. Like those of all members of the genus, the leaves are alternately arranged along the stems. The leaf base is cordate (heart-shaped). The plant is deciduous, bare of leaves from June to September. The orange-red flowers appear from June to October or sometimes November. The yellow-brown woody follicles, or seedpods, mature from September to June.

The species is found in the Northern Territory, north of latitude 17 S. It is a component of open eucalypt woodland, commonly found with Eucalyptus miniata and E. tetrodonta. It generally grows on red soils derived from laterite.

According to the speakers of the Ngan’gityemerri language, the flowering of B. megaphyllus marks the time the freshwater crocodiles are laying eggs.

Commonly cultivated in the Northern Territory, it was listed as the official emblem of the city of Darwin in 1988.

Aboriginal uses 
The Arnhem Land women of Yirrkala, Maningrida, and Gapiwiyak spin thread from the bark of Brachychiton megaphyllus, and use the thread to make necklaces, and bracelets.

The rootstock of young plants can be eaten raw, while fibre from the bark is used to make both rope and string. Stems exude gum which is eaten and can also be used as a paint binder. The seeds are eaten raw or roasted.

Notes

References

External links

megaphyllus
Malvales of Australia
Trees of Australia
Ornamental trees
Plants described in 1988